Meadow Mill is an historic cotton mill in Stockport, Greater Manchester. It is located on the south bank of the River Tame opposite a Tesco Extra supermarket and the M60 motorway. The seven-storey building was built in 1880 for the spinning of cotton and wool by T & J Leigh Ltd, designated as a Grade II listed building in 1975, and redeveloped into 200 apartments with a mixed-use ground floor in 2021.

History

Stockport was a major centre of textile manufacture, particularly cotton spinning and hat making from the Industrial Revolution until the 20th century. The cotton and worsted spinners Thomas and James Leigh, who were operating the Beehive and Hope Mills (now replaced by the motorway and Tesco) in Portwood by 1872, constructed Meadow Mill during the 1870s. By 1914, it contained 120,000 spindles. In 1960 the firm of T & J Leigh ceased trading, but a new company continued to spin carpet and worsted yarn until 1969.

On 10 March 1975, the mill was given a Grade II listing by Historic England as a structure of special architectural or historic interest. It was converted into industrial units for multiple businesses, including furniture stores, wood workshops and gyms, but by the 2010s almost half of the giant mill had become unused through lack of demand or because of deteriorating condition. It was sold to the London-based developer William George Homes in 2016 for £2.5 million, and plans drawn up for residential redevelopment, with planning approved by Stockport Council in 2017.

The following year, Majdiah Residence, a company based in Saudi Arabia, bought the mill and began work on the approved conversion and renovation scheme, which includes 213 one-, two- and three-bedroom apartments, as well as 24,000 sq ft of leisure and commercial space; a further 2,000 sq ft is allocated for restaurant use. Works are due to be completed by May 2021.

Description
Meadow Mill has a front elevation of seven storeys, including the basement, and a width of 41 bays. It is constructed of red brick, with the basement in blue brick below a stone band. The first and second floors are arcaded. The top floor has paired windows with round arched heads and column mullions, with a stone parapet and brick arcaded bracket cornice above. The more ornamental central four bays have stone dressings to the windows, and outer two slightly protrude; lst and 2nd floor arcades have round-headed, stone, carved capitals. The mill's interior structure is cast-iron lengthwise and crosswise beams with brick arches - known as fireproof construction. It is surrounded by a factory chimney to the rear and a single-storey gatehouse. Historic England has called Meadow Mill "a good example of its period".

See also
 List of mills in Stockport

References

Buildings and structures in Stockport
Textile mills in the Metropolitan Borough of Stockport
Cotton mills
Former textile mills in the United Kingdom
Grade II listed buildings in the Metropolitan Borough of Stockport